Glenn Swan (born 1 October 1952) is a former Australian rules footballer who played with Melbourne in the Victorian Football League (VFL).

References

External links 

Profile at Demonwiki

1952 births
Living people
Australian rules footballers from Victoria (Australia)
Melbourne Football Club players
Ormond Amateur Football Club players